The Avon Woods Preserve, owned and operated by the Cincinnati Park Board, is a city park in the North Avondale neighborhood of Cincinnati, Ohio. The park has nature trails, gardens, a nature center and stream, as well as educational programs offered to children. Avon Woods is a nature preserve and is made up of rolling hills, hiking trails and a valley.

References

External links
Avon Woods Nature Center and Preserve – Cincinnati Parks

Parks in Cincinnati
Nature centers in Ohio